Lin Pin-kuan or Peter Lin (born 15 August 1948) is a Taiwanese politician. First elected to the Legislative Yuan as a member of the Kuomintang in 1995, he continued serving until 2012. In 2004, Lin switched affiliations to the Non-Partisan Solidarity Union, and became chairman of the NPSU in 2007.

Education and early career
Lin studied library science at National Taiwan University. Prior to running for office, he worked in the construction industry.

Political career
Lin served his first two full terms in the Legislative Yuan, representing Penghu County, as a member of the Kuomintang. Lin left the Kuomintang in 2001, and in December, won reelection as an independent. He joined the Kuomintang caucus upon taking office for his third term in 2002. Later that year, Lin voted to confirm Yao Chia-wen as President of the Examination Yuan. Shortly after his vote was cast in opposition to KMT caucus wishes, Lin defected to a caucus convened by independents. In June 2004, Lin joined the Non-Partisan Solidarity Union. Lin won reelection twice thereafter running under the NPSU banner. In November 2010, Lin succeeded Kao Chin Su-mei as convenor of the legislature's Internal Administration Committee. His 2012 legislative bid was unsuccessful.

Political stances
Lin has long supported the establishment of casinos in Penghu County. He stated in 2008 that the intention was not "to attract hardcore gamblers, but to develop casino resorts that will bring families." In 2009, Lin said that his constituents had never discussed opposition to the building of casinos with him, blaming disapproval of the initiative on the Democratic Progressive Party and people from the main island of Taiwan. The proposal was rejected by Penghu County residents via referendum in 2009. In December 2010, Lin proposed an amendment to the Offshore Islands Development Act mandating that the government should provide a living stipend, along with funds for transportation so that students native to Taiwan's outlying islands could return home at the end of the school year. To further ease travel for residents of the outlying islands, Lin moved to amend the Civil Aviation Act, so that travel via certain airports and islands received a larger subsidy.

References

1948 births
Living people
National Taiwan University alumni
Leaders of the Non-Partisan Solidarity Union
Non-Partisan Solidarity Union Members of the Legislative Yuan
Members of the 3rd Legislative Yuan
Members of the 4th Legislative Yuan
Members of the 5th Legislative Yuan
Members of the 6th Legislative Yuan
Members of the 7th Legislative Yuan
Kuomintang Members of the Legislative Yuan in Taiwan
Penghu County Members of the Legislative Yuan
Politicians of the Republic of China on Taiwan from Kaohsiung